Glan is a lake in Sweden, located in the province of Östergötland, more specifically within the municipalities of Finspång and Norrköping.

Many species of fish can be found in it, for instance perch, asp, blicca bjoerkna, common bream, zander, and northern pike. A fact that distinguishes Glan is that during the summer the temperature at the bottom stays relatively high, around 14°C. The lake is the main source of water for the city of Norrköping.

References 

Lakes of Östergötland County